Trey Eugene Daniel Turner (born June 15, 1996) is an American professional baseball pitcher who is currently a free agent. He was drafted in the 10th round of the 2017 Major League Baseball draft by the Washington Nationals.

Career
Turner was a two-way player at Neosho High School, seeing time as an outfielder as well as a catcher while also pitching. He went on to attend Crowder College, where he was a position player for the Crowder Roughriders, before attending Missouri State University. He primarily worked out of the bullpen as a right-handed relief pitcher for the Missouri State Bears, racking up 22 strikeouts in  innings with a 2.03 ERA and a 2–0 record in his junior year before an injury ended his season in April 2017. Turner underwent Tommy John surgery on his right elbow. The Nationals, who drafted him in June, were known for their tendency to draft pitchers who needed to have or had already undergone Tommy John surgery, including 2012 draft first-round pick Lucas Giolito and 2016 draft third-round pick Jesus Luzardo, and the team's scouting director told The Washington Post that the organization would "rehab him the right way". Upon being drafted by the Nationals, Turner also attracted some tongue-in-cheek media attention due to the similarity of his name to then-Nationals shortstop Trea Turner, who finished second in the voting for 2016 National League Rookie of the Year. Both Turners pronounce their name the same way, with the only difference being in the spelling of the first name.

Turner returned to action for the 2018 season, making his professional debut with the Low-A Auburn Doubledays on June 16, one day after his 22nd birthday. Turner pitched in 16 games in 2018, recording a 5.30 ERA in 18.2 innings of work between Auburn and the rookie-level GCL Nationals. In 2019, Turner split the season between Auburn and the Single-A Hagerstown Suns, logging a cumulative 4.58 ERA with 62 strikeouts in 39.1 innings pitched. Turner did not play in a game in 2020 due to the cancellation of the minor league season because of the COVID-19 pandemic. Turner was assigned to the Single-A Fredericksburg Nationals, but posted a 5.40 ERA in 13 appearances and was released on August 24, 2021.

References

External links

1996 births
Living people
Baseball players from Kansas
Auburn Doubledays players
Fredericksburg Nationals players
Minor league baseball players